Batista is a Spanish or Portuguese surname. Notable persons with the name include:

 Batista (footballer, born 1955), Brazilian football player
 Dave Bautista, American actor and professional wrestler, also known as Batista
 Edina Alves Batista, Brazilian football referee
 Eike Batista, Brazilian mining businessman
 Felix Batista, American security expert who was kidnapped in 2008
 Fulgencio Batista, Cuban general and president
 Miguel Batista, Dominican baseball player
 Randas Batista, Brazilian medical doctor and cardiac surgeon
 Sergio Batista, Argentine football player and coach
 Tony Batista, Dominican baseball player
 Wesley Batista (born 1972), Brazilian billionaire businessman
 William Batista, Brazilian footballer

Fictional characters
 Angel Batista, a character in Dexter

See also
 Batiste (disambiguation)
 Baptiste (disambiguation)
 Baptista (disambiguation)
 Baptist (disambiguation)
 Batista (grape), Spanish name for the French wine grape Canari noir
 Batista procedure, a surgical operation
 Batiste (surname)
 Battista
 Bautista

References

Portuguese-language surnames
Spanish-language surnames